The Governor General's Foot Guards (GGFG) is the senior reserve infantry regiment in the Canadian Army. Located in Ottawa at the Cartier Square Drill Hall, the regiment is a Primary Reserve infantry unit, and the members are part-time soldiers.

The GGFG are infantry reserve soldiers who train part-time and full-time for domestic operations and international missions. This involves training for domestic operations where the unit deployed members to help during a natural disaster or public emergency such as it did during the 1998 Ice Storm, flooding in 2017 and 2019, and during the COVID-19 pandemic in 2020. It also involves training for international operations and support to the Regular Force on operations in countries such as Afghanistan, Sudan, Iraq, Jordan, Egypt, Latvia, and Ukraine where troops from the regiment have deployed in recent years.

Members of the GGFG train part time between September and June, usually Tuesday evenings and one weekend a month. Between May and August, members can be employed full time in a variety of roles such as students or instructors on training courses, taking part in tasks such as the Ceremonial Guard, and attending field exercises. 

The regiment also runs supplementary training programs such as the marksmanship program to improve shooting skills, and the leadership development training program to prepare soldiers to attend leadership courses. Additionally the regiment runs sports and fitness programs. The GGFG are also affiliated with 1st Battalion, The Royal Canadian Regiment (1 RCR) for reserve integration training.

The GGFG perpetuate the 2nd Canadian Battalion (Eastern Ontario Regiment), CEF, and 77th Battalion (Ottawa), CEF, from the First World War.

Regimental structure
The regiment is composed of the following sub-units:

 Regimental Headquarters Regimental Headquarters is responsible for the overall command, control, and administration of all members of the regiment.
No. 1 Company (Rifle Company) The rifle company conducts collective field training exercises to train soldiers to work together as a team across a range of tactical scenarios. Most of the trained soldiers in the regiment are part of the rifle company.
No. 2 Company (Training Company) The training company runs individual training courses so members can become qualified or complete specialized courses.  It is composed of instructors and students taking part in individual training courses. New members of the regiment are members of the training company until they are fully trained.
No. 3 Company (Combat Service Support) The Support Company provides logistical support to the training being conducted by No. 1 and 2 Companies.
 GGFG Band The regimental band is a brass-and-reed band that represents the regiment at performances around the city and beyond.
 Public Duties Company Public Duties Company (PDC) plans and conducts the Ceremonial Guard during the summer months as well as supporting the governor general and Rideau Hall with ceremonial tasks throughout the year.

The regiment also supports the 2784 GGFG Army Cadets of the Royal Canadian Army Cadets.

The PDC, given the suspension of Ceremonial Guard activities owing to the COVID-19 pandemic since 2020, is ad interim the official guard of honour of the Canadian Armed Forces. This status will continue until the Guard's reconstitution.

Lineage
The GGFG originated in Ottawa, Ontario, on 7 June 1872 as the 1st Battalion Governor General's Foot Guards. It was redesignated as the Governor General's Foot Guards on 16 September 1887; as The Governor General's Foot Guards on 1 April 1896; as the 2nd (Reserve) Battalion, The Governor General's Foot Guards on 7 November 1941; as The Governor General's Foot Guards on 31 January 1946; as The Governor General's Foot Guards (5th Battalion, The Canadian Guards) on 1 September 1954; as the Governor General's Foot Guards (5th Battalion, The Canadian Guards) on 25 April 1958; and finally returned to the name Governor General's Foot Guards on 1 September 1976.

In the Canadian Forces, units may make formal, official links between each other called affiliations. These affiliations are "to foster continuous fraternal connections between military organizations beyond the close, professional relationships which are always encouraged." The GGFG were affiliated with the Canadian Guards, and from 1954 to 1976 they used a Canadian Guards battalion number in token of the affiliation. Despite the battalion number, the GGFG were considered a separate regiment from the Canadian Guards. The affiliation automatically ceased when the Canadian Guards were put on the Supplementary Order of Battle in 1970.

Operational history
Members of the Regiment took part in the Nile Expedition of 1884 and the following year provided a company of sharpshooters to the Battleford column during the North West Rebellion, where the Regiment suffered its first two casualties at the battle of Cut Knife Hill. The company was removed from active service on 24 July 1885.

During the Boer war the regiment contributed volunteers for the various Canadian contingents, mainly the 2nd (Special Service) Battalion, Royal Canadian Regiment of Infantry.

The Great War
The GGFG perpetuates two battalions of the Canadian Expeditionary Force who took part in the First World War. 

The 2nd Battalion (Eastern Ontario Regiment), CEF “The Iron Second”, which was a part of the 1st Infantry Brigade, 1st Canadian Division and saw continuous service on the Western front from 1915 to end of war in 1918.  The 2nd Battalion also fought at the battles of Ypres, St. Julien, Festubert, Pozières, Vimy (1917), Arleux, Hill 70, Passchendaele, Amiens, and Canal du Nord, to name only a few. By the end of the war, 242 officers and 5,084 other ranks had fought with the battalion. Of those, 52 officers and 1,227 other ranks were killed. 

The 77th Battalion (Ottawa), CEF was authorized on 10 July 1915 and embarked for Great Britain on 19 June 1916. It provided reinforcements for the Canadian Corps in the field until 22 September 1916, when its personnel were absorbed by the 47th Battalion (British Columbia), CEF and 73rd Battalion (Royal Highlanders of Canada), CEF and the battalion was disbanded.

The honours and traditions of these battalions are perpetuated by the GGFG.

The Second World War
During the Second World War the GGFG was mobilized in May 1940.  In 1942 the regiment was re-rolled to become an armoured unit to address the need for more armoured units in the Canadian Army, assuming the name “21st Canadian Armoured Regiment (G.G.F.G.)”. It embarked for Great Britain on 23 September 1942. On 24 July 1944, it landed in France as part of the 4th Armoured Brigade, 4th Canadian Armoured Division and it continued to fight in northwest Europe until the end of the war taking part in the battle of Normandy, the battle of the Scheldt, and the Rhineland. Over the course of the war the Regiment’s casualties were 101 dead and 284 wounded. The overseas regiment was disbanded on 31 January 1946.

Modern day
In the intervening years, members have participated in United Nations and NATO operations, including service in the Cyprus, Somalia, the Former Republic of Yugoslavia, Haiti, Ethiopia, and Sierra Leone. During the Canadian mission in Afghanistan, the GGFG deployed members, taking part Task Force 3-06, Task Force 3-08, and Task Force 1-10 in Kandahar, as well as the Operation Attention training mission in Kabul.

The GGFG provides individual augmentation to the Regular Force when they deploy on operations. The regiment deployed members on Operation Impact in Iraq and Jordan, Operation Calumet in Egypt, Operation Soprano in Sudan, Operation Reassurance in Poland and Latvia, and Operation Unifier in the Ukraine.

The regiment maintains domestic response capability to support Canadians at home in natural disasters or emergencies. The regiment deployed soldiers to the 1998 Ice Storm, floods 2017 and 2019, and during the COVID-19 pandemic in 2020.

Alliances 

  – Coldstream Guards

Battle honours 
 North West Canada, 1885
 South Africa 1899–1900
 World War I: Ypres 1915, 1917, Flers-Courcelette, Passchendaele, Gravenstafel, Ancre Heights, Amiens, St. Julien, Arras 1917, 1918, Drocourt-Queant, Festubert, 1915, Vimy 1917, Hindenburg Line, Mount Sorrel, Arleux, Canal du Nord, Somme, 1916, Scarpe, 1917–18, Pursuit to Mons, Pozières, Hill 70, France and Flanders 1915–18
 World War II: The Hochwald, The Rhineland, Chambois, Falaise, Veen, The Scheldt, Falaise Road, Bad Zwichenahn, The Lower Maas, The Laison, North West Europe 1944-1945
 Afghanistan

Victoria Cross recipients

Monuments 
The No 1 Company Governor Generals Foot Guards and the Ladies Soldiers Aid Association of Ottawa erected a memorial tablet which was unveiled on May 2, 1887; The memorial is dedicated to the memory of Privates J. Rogers and Wm. B. Osgood who died in action at Cut Knife Hill on May 2, 1885, during the Northwest Rebellion.

A memorial plaque in the GGFG Regimental Museum is dedicated to the memory of the 5326 Officers and Men who served in the 2nd Canadian Infantry Battalion Canadian Expeditionary force during the Great War 1914-1918.

A Second World War–era Sherman tank nicknamed Forceful III in the Canadian War Museum, is dedicated to the memory of the members of the GGFG killed during the Second World War while operating as an armoured regiment.

Lieutenant-colonels commanding

Rank names
 Ensign  Second lieutenants (OF-1) in Guard regiments are referred by their former title of ensign (Esgn). The name derives from the task the newest joined officers were entrusted with, carrying the ensign or colours.
 Colour sergeant  Personnel carrying the rank of warrant officer (OR-7) in Guard regiments are called by their former title of colour sergeant (CSgt). This rank originated from the appointment of specific sergeants to escort and defend the colours. Lower ranks refer to colour sergeants as "Sir" or "Ma'am" rather than "Warrant" as in other units.
 Guardsman  Upon successful completion of recruit training soldiers are addressed as guardsman (Gdsm/OR-3). King George V awarded this honour in 1918 to mark the service of regiments of Foot Guards during the First World War. General Order 138 of 1928 promulgates this honour.
 Musician  Upon successful completion of recruit training members of the band are addressed as musician (Muscn/OR-3).

Regimental museum

The Governor General's Foot Guards Regimental Museum collects, preserves, studies and exhibits those objects that serve to illustrate
the history and traditions of the regiment. The museum will collect materials that depict the regiment’s past in terms of war, ceremonial, training, sport and other affairs that have influenced the regiment over the years. The museum will provide for the preservation of such material and for its availability to all those who wish to see and study it. The museum will be a non-profit educational establishment, operated for the regiment and open to the public, regardless of race, creed, or occupation. The museum will disseminate knowledge and stimulate interest through materials, information services by holding meetings and arranging special programs for the regiment, the association and the public for the furtherance of the purpose of the museum. The museum co-operates with the regiment, association, the National War Museum and other museums as well as the Municipality of Ottawa-Carleton, to collect and preserve materials of significance so that these materials may be preserved and aid in the advancement of knowledge of the regiment. The Guards' museum holds many artifacts from throughout the history of the regiment. Some of the artifacts displayed are a captured German trench periscope, various firearms from past wars including a Second World War–era German MG42, a MP 40, and a copy of Mein Kampf signed by Adolf Hitler. Also on display are several books containing photographs from World War II. The museum is located in the south end of the Cartier Square Drill Hall and is open on parade nights or by appointment.

Order of precedence

Freedoms 
The regiment has received the Freedom twice throughout its history at the following occasions:

  1972: Ottawa
  2022: Ottawa

Badge and motto

Drill Hall

See also

 Canadian Guards
 List of armouries in Canada
 Military history of Canada
 History of the Canadian Army
 Governor General's Foot Guards Band
 Ceremonial Guard

References

Further reading

External links

 
 GGFG Regimental Museum
 GGFG Regimental Association
 Time-lapse video of training in Ottawa
 The Guards Star newsletter

Governor General's Foot Guards
Infantry regiments of Canada
Guards regiments
Military units and formations established in 1872
Museums in Ottawa
Regimental museums in Canada
1872 establishments in Canada
Canadian Militia units of The North-West Rebellion
Armoured regiments & units of Canada in World War II
Monarchy in Canada
Canadian ceremonial units